John W. Clark is an American architect and planner and a founding partner of the firm Cordogan Clark & Associates. Clark has been recognized for his architectural, planning, and sustainable design work for a series of projects.

Biography and influences
Clark was born in Chicago, Illinois. He studied architecture and planning at the University of Illinois in a program that included study at the École des Beaux-Arts in Versailles, France. He studied art at the Art Institute of Chicago, where he also taught on the faculty. He did postgraduate studies in Infrastructure Technology at Northwestern University. After graduation from the University of Illinois he joined VISTA as an inner city Chicago architect working with inner city neighborhood organizations on schools, public, institutional, and residential projects in 1977. In 1979 he joined Hammond Beeby & Babka where he worked for five years as an architect. In 1984 with John Cordogan he formed the Cordogan, Clark & Associates partnership.

Chicago Bridges Design Competition
Clark with his firm Cordogan Clark & Associates designed the winning entries for the  designs of the 41st and 43rd Street Bridges spanning Lake Shore Drive in Chicago. These placed first among 67 entrants in an international design competition. Called "the state of the art in asymmetrical design" on NPR, Cordogan Clark & Associates teamed with the Chicago-based firm Earthtech to provide structural and civil engineering for these bridges. This pair of bridges will create a gateway for those approaching the city of Chicago from the south.

Awards
Clark has won national and international design and design/ build competitions for a variety of projects. He has completed a projects involving urban planning, municipal design, and historic and contextual design. Recent work includes projects in China. Several of Cordogan, Clark and Associates' projects have been recognized for their sustainable aspects, including the Aurora Police Headquarters in Aurora, Illinois and Devon Bank in Wheeling, Illinois, which both received LEED Gold Certification. His work has received awards from The National Society of Arts and Letters, the American Institute of Architects, the Precast Concrete Institute; and has received Community Beautification Awards.

Juries, teaching, and lectures
Clark has served on design award juries for The American Institute of Architects and has been a visiting design juror at the University of Illinois, Illinois Institute of Technology, and at the Art Institute of Chicago, where he has also served on the design faculty. He has also lectured at Tongji University, Shanghai; and at the  Huazhong University of Science and Technology, Wuhan, China.

References

External links
 
 Cordogan Clark and Associates- Archiplanet listing
 "Reston Revisited" in Planning (American Planning Association) by John W. Clark describes how the famous new town is still evolving.
 Illinois Tollway - The Auto Channel

20th-century American architects
Living people
Year of birth missing (living people)
21st-century American architects
Architects from Illinois
University of Illinois alumni
School of the Art Institute of Chicago alumni